Michael Shure  (born April 18, 1966) is an American politician and former national correspondent for Nexstar Media Group's national newscast on NewsNation. He was previously the Senior National Correspondent and Anchor for i24NEWS, Cheddar News, and an original member of, and regular host on The Young Turks. He was the host of that network's online 2012 election show, twenTYTwelve.  Shure was previously the host of Current TV's The War Room with Michael Shure, a one-hour political commentary program that aired live Monday through Thursday; and later was the Chief Political Correspondent for Al Jazeera America until the network's closure. Shure has also occasionally appeared as an actor.
On March 11, 2022, Shure announced his candidacy for the CA-37 Congressional seat.

Biography
Shure was born in New York City to Michael and Alice Shure. Shure attended Trinity School (New York City) and the University of Virginia. He was Florida press secretary for the Dukakis/Bentsen Presidential campaign during the 1988 presidential election.

Shure is an alumnus of the NBC Page program. He was a correspondent for the short-lived show CNN NewsStand

In 2002, Shure began working as a host and correspondent on The Young Turks, a multi-platform political talk show. He followed the show to Current TV in 2011 where he was a political correspondent and guest host for the network. In February 2013 he took over as host for former Michigan governor Jennifer Granholm and the show, previously called The War Room With Jennifer Granholm became The War Room with Michael Shure until August 2013 when the show was ended with the rest of Current's live programming in preparation of the network's transition to Al Jazeera America.

In 2017, Shure became the Senior National Correspondent and Anchor for i24NEWS, the US arm of the international Israel-headquartered news network.

Shure has appeared as an actor in the films The Thing Called Love, House Party 3, and Showgirls. He also appeared in an episode of the HBO show Curb Your Enthusiasm.

Personal 
Shure's uncle was film producer Robert Evans. His brother, Tony Shure, co-founded Chopt Salad Company. He currently resides in Los Angeles, California.

References

Current TV people
The Young Turks people
Living people
1966 births
Television personalities from New York City
Al Jazeera people
CNN people
20th-century American Jews
Trinity School (New York City) alumni
University of Virginia alumni
21st-century American Jews
Candidates in the 2022 United States House of Representatives elections